German submarine U-28 was a Type VIIA U-boat of Nazi Germany's Kriegsmarine during World War II.

Her keel was laid down on 2 December 1935, by DeSchiMAG AG Weser of Bremen. She was launched on 14 July 1936, and commissioned into Kriegsmarine on 12 September 1936, with Kapitänleutnant Wilhelm Ambrosius in command. Ambrosius was succeeded by nine other commanding officers over the next eight years.

U-28 conducted seven war patrols between 19 August 1939 and 15 November 1940, all under the command of Kapitänleutnant Günter Kuhnke, sinking 13 ships totaling  and damaging two others totaling .

After her third patrol, U-28 became a training vessel and was used to bring new U-boat crews up to standard. She was later sunk in an accident on 17 March 1944 and stricken on 4 August 1944.

Construction and design

Construction
U-28 was ordered by the Kriegsmarine on 1 April 1935 as part of the German Plan Z and in violation of the Treaty of Versailles. Her keel was laid down in the AG Weser shipyard in Bremen as yard number 909 on 2 December 1935. After about ten months of construction, she was launched on 14 July 1936 and commissioned into the Kriegsmarine as the third Type VIIA submarine on 12 September 1936 under the command of Kapitänleutnant Wilhelm Ambrosius.

Design

Like all Type VIIA submarines, U-28 displaced  while surfaced and  when submerged. U-28s propulsion consisted of two MAN 6-cylinder 4-stroke M 6 V 40/46 diesel engines that totaled . Her maximum rpm was between 470 and 485. The submarine was also equipped with two Brown, Boveri & Cie GG UB 720/8 electric motors that totaled . Their maximum rpm was 322. These power plants gave U-28 a maximum speed of  while surfaced and  when submerged.

The U-boat's test depth was  but she could go as deep as  without having her hull crushed. U-28s armament consisted of five  torpedo tubes, (four located in the bow and one in the stern). She could have up to eleven torpedoes on board or 22 TMA mines or 33 TMB mines. U-28 was also equipped with a C35 88 mm gun/L45 deck gun with 220 rounds. Her anti-aircraft defenses consisted of one  anti-aircraft gun.

Service history

First patrol
U-28s first war patrol took place from 19 August to 29 September 1939. On 14 September, while sailing around the mouth of St George's Channel, U-28 sank a 5,000 GRT freighter, which was her only success of the patrol.

Second patrol
U-28s second war patrol took place from 8 November to 12 December 1939. For this effort she was instructed to lay a minefield near the port city of Swansea. En route to Bristol, U-28 sank two ships; the 5,000 GRT Dutch tanker MV Sliedrecht and the 5,100 GRT British freighter SS Royston Grange. U-28 then laid her minefield and returned to port in Germany. While the minefield was not an immediate success, it sank the 9,600 GRT British freighter  60 days after it was laid.

Third patrol
U-28s third sortie took place from 18 February to 25 March 1940. She was instructed to lay mines off the British Naval Base at Portsmouth. After U-28 laid the minefield, she went on to sink two ships for 11,200 GRT.

Fourth patrol
U-28s fourth war patrol took place from 8 June to 7 July 1940. She was sent to the Western Approaches and turned in an average performance of sinking three ships totalling 10,300 GRT.

Fifth patrol
U-28s fifth war patrol took place from 11 August to 17 September 1940 and was one of Kuhnke's most productive. In August, she sank two ships for 5,500 GRT. On 10 September, U-28 found and tracked Convoy OA 210. In the darkness of early morning on 11 September, U-28 attacked the convoy and claimed two large freighters (13,000 GRT each) sunk and caused damage to a 10,000 GRT tanker, bringing Kuhnke's total for the patrol to five ships for 30,000 GRT. However, during the postwar analysis, he was only credited with sinking a 2,000 GRT Dutch freighter and damaging a 4,700 GRT British freighter; which, combined with his earlier sinkings, brought his total to four ships for 9,945 GRT. On his return to Lorient Kuhnke was awarded the Knight's Cross for his work.

Sixth patrol
U-28s sixth and final war patrol took her from Lorient back to Germany; because of the heavy seas and foul weather, U-28 sank only half a ship for 2,694 GRT. (U-28 and  shared credit for the sinking of the SS Matina). On 15 November 1940, she returned to Germany and was turned over to the training command. Günter Kuhnke proceeded to command .

Fate
U-28 sank by accident on 17 March 1944, at the U-boat pier in Neustadt. During a training exercise, the boat had passed under a dummy freighter used for target practice. The commander-in-training failed to note the position of the stationary freighter, and the U-boat's conning tower was ripped off. Water flooded the control room, but the other compartments remained intact. The crew escaped by slowly equalizing the water pressure in the boat and swimming to the surface. The boat was raised in March 1944, but was stricken on 4 August. The submarine's crew suffered no casualties during her career.

Wolfpacks
U-28 took part in one wolfpack, namely:
 Prien (12 – 17 June 1940)

Summary of raiding history

References

Notes

Citations

Bibliography

External links

1936 ships
German Type VIIA submarines
Military units and formations of Nazi Germany in the Spanish Civil War
Ships built in Bremen (state)
U-boats sunk in collisions
U-boat accidents
U-boats commissioned in 1936
U-boats sunk in 1944
World War II submarines of Germany
Maritime incidents in March 1944